The Carbajal Valley is a valley in the Fuegian Andes of southern Tierra del Fuego Province, Argentina.

Argentine Route 3 runs diagonally through Ushuaia (SW-NE) along the Río Olivia past the west base of Mount Olivia and around the northwestern and northern base of Monte Cinco Hermanos.

Topography
During the Last Glacial Maximum (LGM), approximately 20,000 years ago, a valley glacier carved the Carbajal-Tierra Mayor valley (described as the "glaciation axis of the Fuegian Andes") from northwest to southeast, with an ice tongue forking south along the Valle Río Olivia into the Beagle Channel immediately to the east of Ushuaia. Several existing glaciers (e.g., Ojos de Albino, Vinciguerra) were tributaries of the Carbajal glacier.

In the early Holocene period (11,700–8,200 years ago), by 10,300 years ago, ice had receded from the valley walls and vegetation was growing. By the middle Holocene period (8,200–4,200 years ago), forest growth was expanding.

The nearly U-shaped valley floor is covered with Sphagnum peat bogs and poorly drained mires.

References

Notes

Sources

External links

Landforms of Tierra del Fuego Province, Argentina
Valleys of Argentina